Keep Me Singing is the 36th studio album by Northern Irish singer-songwriter Van Morrison, released on 30 September 2016 by Caroline Records. It is Morrison's highest-charting album in the US, and third US Top 10 album, following the success of Keep It Simple (2008) and Born to Sing: No Plan B (2012).

Critical reception

Keep Me Singing received generally positive reviews from music critics, with Metacritic giving the album an average score of 74 / 100 based on ten reviews. Rolling Stone found that "through arrangements elegant to a fault, his mercurial tenor, more supple and restrained, remains a marvel", with his delivery at times being "full of chortles, snarls and gospel-tinged hollers." Hot Press wrote that Morrison's "voice is as strong and expressive as ever, while the songs are a mix of familiar-sounding, soulful ballads and mid-tempo jazz-influenced tunes." His "liquid-smooth voice" is "just as soulful as ever", wrote PopMatters, finding that Morrison "draws on a variety of vocal traditions from Celtic folk to contemporary jazz", and combines them "through the sheer force of his being." Consequence concluded that "[there] are very few constants in life, but another warm record from Van the Man seems par for the course", but noted that it was "pierced with a severe, self-reflective melancholy".

Accolades

Commercial performance
Keep Me Singing debuted at number four on the UK Albums Chart, and at number nine on the US Billboard 200. It sold 25,000 units in the US in its first week, with almost all of that figure in traditional album sales. It is his last US Top 10 to date.

Track listing

Personnel

 Van Morrison - vocals, guitar (1-3,6,7,11,12), drums (4,5), piano (13), alto saxophone (8,10,13), blues harp (1,3,11).
 Dave Keary - acoustic and electric guitar (1,2,6,8-10).
 Johnny Scott - electric guitar (3,11).
 Nigel Price - acoustic and electric guitar (4,5,12).
 John Platania - acoustic guitar (7,13).
 Paul Moore - bass (1,2,7,8,10,13).
 Nicky Scott - bass (3,11).
 Jez Brown - bass (6,9). 
 Laurence Cottle - bass (4,5,12), trombone (8,10,12).
 Paul Moran - keyboards (1,2,4-10,12,13), trumpet (2,8-10,12).
 Fiachra Trench - keyboards (1-5,8,10-12), strings arrangements (1-2,4-5,7).
 Enda Walsh - keyboards (2,3,7), percussion (3).
 Robbie Ruggiero - drums (1,6,9).
 Liam Bradley - drums and percussion (2,3,7,8,10,11).
 Paul Robinson - drums (4,5,12).
 Neal Wilkinson - drums (13).
 Kate St John - english horn (4,5).
 Anthony Kerr - vibraphone (8,10).
 Tony Fitzgibbon - fiddle (13).
 Ange Grant, Dana Masters, Lance Ellington - backing vocals.

Charts

Weekly charts

Year-end charts

References

2016 albums
Van Morrison albums
Albums produced by Van Morrison